Lipp may refer to:

Eliot Lipp (born 1980), American electronic music artist
Maria Lipp (1892–1966), German organic chemist
Heino Lipp (1922–2006), Estonian decathlete and shot putter
Marko Lipp (born 1999), Estonian footballer
Martin Lipp (1854–1923), Estonian poet
Robert I. Lipp, American businessman
Tom Lipp (1870–1932), American baseball player
Wilma Lipp (1925–2019), Austrian operatic soprano

See also
Lexikon der indogermanischen Partikeln und Pronominalstämme (LIPP, "Lexicon of the Indo-European Particles and Pronominal Stems"), an etymological dictionary
Brasserie Lipp, a café in Paris
Lipps (disambiguation)

Estonian-language surnames